Luis Francisco de Benavides Carrillo de Toledo, Marquis of Caracena, Marquis of Fromista (20 September 1608 in Valencia – 6 January 1668 in Madrid) was a Spanish general and political figure. He served as Governor of the Habsburg Netherlands between 1659 and 1664.

Raised in a noble Spanish family, he made a career in the army during the many battles in Italy and Flanders between 1629 and 1659. He conquered the fortress of Casale Monferrato in 1652.

He was Governor of Milan between 1648 and 1656. After the defeat of John of Austria the Younger in the Battle of the Dunes (1658), Caracena was appointed to succeed him. After the conclusion of the Treaty of the Pyrenees, the Habsburg Netherlands saw a period of relative peace. Despite this fact, governing wasn't easy for Caracena, since by then various wars had pushed Spain to the brink of bankruptcy.

In 1664 he returned to Spain to assume command of the war against Portugal, which was going poorly after a series of military setbacks, most recently after the defeat in 1663 in the Battle of Ameixial, near Estremoz of the same John of Austria the Younger. Caracena's command of the Spanish forces in Portugal was brief; he was decisively defeated by António Luís de Meneses at the Battle of Montes Claros in 1665. The defeat effectively ended the War of Restoration in favor of the Portuguese.

After the battle, Caracena was charged with treason and cowardice. He defended himself by claiming that he was not to blame, but rather the defeat was due to the poor state of the Spanish army, intrigue in the Spanish Court, and the lack of funds to protract a war against Portugal. Afterwards, he was disregarded by the Spanish Crown and died of disease in 1668.

External links  

1608 births
1668 deaths
Spanish generals
Governors of the Habsburg Netherlands
Military personnel of the Franco-Spanish War (1635–1659)